Simon of Hauteville (Palermo 1093 – Mileto 1105), called Simon de Hauteville in French and Simone D'Altavilla in Italian, was the eldest son and successor of Roger the Great Count, count of Sicily, and Adelaide del Vasto, under whose regency he reigned.

The chronicler Alexander of Telese relates an incident that took place during the childhood of Simon and his brother, Roger:
As the way of children, they were playing a coin game which was a favorite of theirs, and fell to fighting. When they fought, each with a group of boys whom they had gathered together, the younger, Roger, was the conqueror. As a result, he mocked his brother Simon, saying, "It would be far better that I should have the honor of ruling triumphantly after our father's death than you. However, when I shall be able to do this I shall make you a bishop or even Pope in Rome - to which you're far better suited.

Simon was young when he ascended to the county in 1101 and he died only four years later in Mileto, Calabria in 1105.  His death allowed his brother, Roger, who would be King of Sicily, to succeed him.

References

Sources

1093 births
1105 deaths
12th-century monarchs in Europe
Counts of Sicily
Italo-Normans
Sicilian people of Norman descent
Medieval child monarchs
Nobility from Palermo
Counts of Malta
Roger II of Sicily